The Texas Rangers 1990 season involved the Rangers finishing 3rd in the American League west with a record of 83 wins and 79 losses.

Offseason
 October 2, 1989: Cecilio Guante was released by the Rangers.

Regular season
 June 11, 1990: Nolan Ryan threw his sixth no-hitter against the Oakland Athletics.
 July 30, 1990: Nolan Ryan earned his 300th win against the Milwaukee Brewers.

Season standings

Record vs. opponents

Notable transactions
 June 4, 1990: 1990 Major League Baseball draft
Dan Smith was drafted by the Rangers in the 1st round (16th pick).
Rusty Greer was drafted by the Rangers in the 10th round. Player signed June 5, 1990.
 June 14, 1990: Randy St. Claire was signed as a free agent by the Rangers.
 September 4, 1990: Randy St. Claire was released by the Rangers.

Nolan Ryan's 6th No-Hitter
 June 11, 1990: At Oakland Alameda County Coliseum, Nolan Ryan, at forty-three years, four months, and twelve days, became the oldest pitcher in major league history to throw a no-hitter. He would become the only pitcher in the history of Major League Baseball to throw a no-hitter for three different teams (the Angels, the Astros, the Rangers). Ryan would also hold the distinction of holding the record for longest time between two no-hitters. Ryan who tossed his fifth no-hitter on September 26, 1981, and this one on June 11.

Roster

Player stats

Batting

Starters by position
Note: Pos = Position; G = Games played; AB = At bats; H = Hits; Avg. = Batting average; HR = Home runs; RBI = Runs batted in

Other batters
Note: G = Games played, AB = At bats; H = Hits; Avg. = Batting average; HR = Home runs; RBI = Runs batted in

Pitching

Starting pitchers
Note: G = Games pitched; IP = Innings pitched; W = Wins; L = Losses; ERA = Earned run average; SO = Strikeouts

Other pitchers
Note: G = Games pitched; IP = Innings pitched; W = Wins; L = Losses; ERA = Earned run average; SO = Strikeouts

Relief pitchers
Note: G = Games pitched; W = Wins; L = Losses; SV = Saves; ERA = Earned run average; SO = Strikeouts

Awards and honors
 Julio Franco, Silver Slugger Award
 Julio Franco – All-Star Game Most Valuable Player
 Rafael Palmeiro, American League Leader in Hits (191)
 Gary Pettis, OF, AL Gold Glove
 Nolan Ryan – American League Leader Strikeouts (232)

All-Star Game
 Julio Franco, second base, reserve

Farm system

References

1990 Texas Rangers at Baseball Reference
1990 Texas Rangers at Baseball Almanac

Texas Rangers seasons
Texas Rangers season
Texas Rangers